Sebastian Dacey (born 1982 London) is a German artist.

He studied at the Wimbledon College of Art, and at the Akademie der Bildenden Künste in Munich. 

He has exhibited at the Kunstverein Heilbronn and the Kunstbau Lenbachhaus in Munich, Jacky Strenz, Frankfurt,

He lives in Berlin.

Awards
 2010 Villa Romana prize

References

External links
"Sebastian Dacey", Artnet

German artists
1982 births
Living people
Academy of Fine Arts, Munich alumni